Antonio R. Adipe Marrone (born 24 April 1912, date of death unknown) was a Uruguayan boxer who competed in the 1936 Summer Olympics. In 1936 he was eliminated in the second round of the light heavyweight class after losing his fight to Thomas Griffin of Great Britain.

1936 Olympic results
 Round of 32: bye
 Round of 16: lost to Thomas Griffin (Great Britain) by decision

External links
Antonio Adipe's profile at Sports Reference.com

1912 births
Year of death missing
Boxers at the 1936 Summer Olympics
Light-heavyweight boxers
Olympic boxers of Uruguay
Uruguayan male boxers